My Lisa Karolina Nilsson (born 13 August 1970) is a Swedish singer. 

She was discovered by the producer William (Billy) Butt and she is perhaps best known in Sweden for her 1992 hit, Himlen runt hörnet, written by Mauro Scocco and Johan Ekelund. It was released in English in 1995, titled Ticket to Heaven. She has released four subsequent albums, Till Morelia in 1995, Viva in 2000, Små rum in 2002 and Hotel Vermont 609 in 2006, all in Swedish.  A greatest hits compilation, Samlade sånger followed in 2003 and contained two new songs.  Prior to Himlen runt hörnet she had released two English language albums, Lean On Love in 1989 and Indestructible in 1991, both released by William Butt. She also participated in Melodifestivalen 1989.

Nilsson's style ranges from out and out pop music to soul-inflected ballads and dance tracks on her earlier albums to a more mature jazz feel in her more recent work, perhaps reflecting familial connections as her father Gösta Nilsson is a jazz pianist.

In 2002, she moved into acting with appearances in the Swedish TV sitcom, Cleo and a role in the Swedish film Paradiset made by British-born director Colin Nutley.

In February 2007 she gave birth to a daughter.

Discography

Albums

Compilation albums

Collaborative albums

Singles

Other charted songs

Citations 

Swedish-language singers
1970 births
Living people
21st-century Swedish singers
21st-century Swedish women singers
English-language singers from Sweden
Melodifestivalen contestants of 1989